Cho Ja-young (born May 26, 1991), better known by her stage name Ah Young, is a South Korean singer and actress, as well known as a member of the South Korean girl group Dal Shabet.

Early life 
Ah Young was born on May 26, 1991, in Seoul, South Korea. She attended Dongduk Women's University majoring in Entertainment.

Career

2011–2012: Career beginnings 

Ah Young made her official debut through the release of Supa Dupa Diva with Dal Shabet on January 3, 2011.

On February 28, 2011, Ah Young made a cameo, with Dal Shabet, in the hit KBS drama Dream High, as a student of Kirin High School. Ah Young and Dal Shabet later appeared in the movie Wonderful Radio as the fictional girl group 'Corby Girls'.

Ah Young also participated in Dal Shabet's reality shows Sweet Sweet Story and Cool Friends, as well as their YouTube series Shabet on Air.

2013–present: Acting roles 
It was announced on January 9, 2013, that Ah Young would be making her first solo drama appearance in KBS' Ad Genius Lee Tae-baek. She played Gong Sun-hye, a secretary for the advertisement firm 'GRC'. Her character received media spotlight for her eccentric personality, as well as her unique sense of fashion.

Ah Young was revealed to have joined the cast of the SBS historical drama Jang Ok-jung, Living by Love on March 14, 2013. She played the recurring character Princess Myeongan, who is known for displaying a cute sense of humor throughout the palace.

On May 22, 2013, Ah Young was added to the cast of the movie No Breathing.  She played the character Se-Mi, a high school student who dreamed of becoming a famous singer. No Breathing marks Ah Young's first solo appearance in a big-screen film.

On September 9, 2013, Ah Young was confirmed to be joining the cast of the movie 58 – The Year of the Dog as the character Geum Hong.  The movie was released in 2014.

In November 2013, Ah Young landed her first leading role in Naver TV's web drama Someday, playing the character Lee Ji-eun.

It was revealed on June 13, 2014, that Ah Young had been cast in the MBC drama Diary of a Night Watchman as the recurring character Hong Cho-hee.

In November 2014, Ah Young was cast in a lead role in MBC's drama Love Frequency 37.2, playing the character Jung Sun-hee.

In October 2016, Ah Young was cast in a support role in SBS's drama Our Gap-soon, playing the Gap-dol's colleague Kim Young-ran.

In December 2017, Ahyoung joined SidusHQ after her contract with Happy Face Entertainment ended.
With a change of label, her future activities with Dal Shabet remains in discussion.

Filmography

Films

Television series

Discography

Original soundtrack

Collaborations

References

External links 

1991 births
Dal Shabet members
K-pop singers
Living people
IHQ (company) artists
South Korean female idols
South Korean women pop singers
South Korean film actresses
South Korean television actresses